Bernard Goldstein (1889–1959), sometimes called "Comrade Bernard", was a Polish socialist, union organizer, and leader of the General Jewish Labour Bund in Poland prior to World War II. During the war, he was active in the Warsaw Ghetto, helping smuggle in arms in preparation for the 1943 Warsaw Ghetto Uprising.

After Poland's liberation from German occupation, he emigrated to the United States and wrote his autobiography, Five Years in the Warsaw Ghetto (originally titled The Stars Bear Witness).

Life
In the late years of Imperial Russia, Goldstein's political activities landed him in Siberian exile and Russian prisons. Beginning in 1919, Goldstein was active as an organizer and militia leader in the Bund movement in Poland, and was later active in the Warsaw Ghetto Resistance. During the time he spent living in and organizing resistance against the Nazis in the Ghetto, Nazi Germany systematically murdered half a million Jews once resident there.

Over a year after the German Army had reduced the Warsaw Ghetto to rubble in liquidating its remaining Jewish occupants, Socialist resister survivors were rounded up by the Soviets and either imprisoned or executed.

Throughout the occupation, in spite of numerous confidence tricks by the Nazis and their assistants in the Jewish Gestapo to produce docility in the Ghetto population by labeling the forced removals to Treblinka as mere "work resettlement," Goldstein remained adamant that the Nazis were in fact gradually liquidating the Ghetto's residents. Via underground publications, Goldstein urged the Ghetto population to resist the German Army at all costs and not to cooperate with the Jewish collaborators whom the Gestapo controlled. When deportations started, his organization manufactured fake documents for those marked for liquidation.

When it became clear the Nazis were planning to kill everyone, Goldstein helped organize the Warsaw Ghetto Uprising which ultimately ended in the Ghetto's destruction. Escaping the Ghetto, Goldstein joined the Polish resistance and helped stage the following year's citywide 1944 Warsaw Uprising.

In 1945 Goldstein emigrated to the US. In the book Five Years in the Warsaw Ghetto he described the life prevailing in the ghetto and the heroic struggle of Jewish soldiers. His authority in Bund leadership, which he enjoyed before the war and his position in the Jewish underground during the war, described him in contemporary world historiography as the chronicler of the last hours of Jewish Warsaw.

See also
List of Poles

References

External links
 Five Years in the Warsaw Ghetto, Goldstein's autobiography

1889 births
1959 deaths
Polish socialists
Bundists
Warsaw Ghetto inmates
Warsaw Ghetto Uprising insurgents